The Villa-Lobos Museum (Portuguese: Museu Villa-Lobos) is a museum in Rio de Janeiro, Brazil, that is dedicated to exhibiting artifacts related to the composer Heitor Villa-Lobos.

History 
In 1960, the museum was founded by Arminda Neves d'Almeida, Heitor Villa-Lobos's second wife, who directed the museum for 24 years. The 19th-century building that houses it is listed by the National Institute of Historic and Artistic Heritage. The museum occasionally hosts concerts. In 2020, it launched a virtual exhibition titled "Native Brazilian Music" containing 50 photographs and audio recordings of Brazilian songs, as well as photographs of musicians in recordings. It was shown at Google Arts & Culture where letters between Leopold Stokowski and Villa-Lobos were shown as well as newspaper clippings. In June 2021, the museum launched a virtual exhibition titled "Memórias de Arminda" about the life of Arminda Neves, which included an adapted version of Google Street View.

Collections 
The museum has a collection of objects and documents about the life and work of Heitor Villa-Lobos; a collection of musical instruments, books and scores; recordings and tapes; and a collection of conducting batons.

References

External links 
 
 Google Arts & Culture

Biographical museums in Brazil
Museums established in 1960
Museums in Rio de Janeiro (city)
Music museums